The 2015 Pan American Ice Hockey Tournament was the second edition of the Pan American Ice Hockey Tournament, an annual event run by the Federación Deportiva de México de Hockey sobre Hielo, sanctioned by International Ice Hockey Federation. It took place in Mexico City, Mexico between June 3 and 7, 2015.

Participants
North America
  (host)
  Mexico U17

South America
 
  "B"

Schedules
(UTC–06:00)

Standings

References

Pan American Ice Hockey Tournament
Pan American Ice Hockey Tournament
2015
2015